Gerard Fabiano is an American Magic: The Gathering player from New Jersey. His best finishes include a fourth place at Pro Tour Boston 2002 and wins at Grand Prix Philadelphia 2008, Grand Prix Montreal 2014, and Grand Prix Baltimore 2014.

Achievements

References

1983 births
Living people
American Magic: The Gathering players
People from Belleville, New Jersey